The 1885 South Australian Football Association season was the 9th season of the top-level Australian rules football competition in South Australia.

The Adelaide Football Club  combined with North Parks from the Adelaide and Suburban Football Association and returned to the league in a standalone capacity for the first time since 1880 (it had merged with Kensington for the 1881 season, but resigned after  five games).

The 1885 SAFA season was the first time since 1878 that all clubs played a fixed number of games.

Twenty three of the thirty games played had crowd figures quoted for an approximate average of 1,800 spectators per game.

Premiership season

Round 1

Round 2

Round 3

Round 4

Round 5

Round 6

Round 7

Round 8

Round 9

Round 10

Round 11

Round 12

Round 13

Round 14

Round 15

Round 16

Round 17

Ladder

References 

SANFL
South Australian National Football League seasons